The Smoothwater River is a river of the West Coast Region of New Zealand's South Island. It flows north to reach the Tasman Sea three kilometres west of the western end of Jackson Bay.

See also
List of rivers of New Zealand

References

Rivers of the West Coast, New Zealand
Westland District
Rivers of New Zealand